Bruno Fistori (born January 11, 1991 in Córdoba, Argentina) is an Argentine footballer currently playing for Independiente Medellín of the Primera A in Colombia.

Teams
  Chacarita Juniors 2010-2011
  Independiente Medellín 2011–2012

References
 
 

1991 births
Living people
Argentine footballers
Argentine expatriate footballers
Chacarita Juniors footballers
Independiente Medellín footballers
Categoría Primera A players
Expatriate footballers in Colombia
Association footballers not categorized by position
Footballers from Córdoba, Argentina
21st-century Argentine people